Novy (masculine), Novaya (feminine), or Novoye (neuter) is the name of several rural localities in Russia.

Modern localities

Republic of Adygea
As of 2012, two rural localities in the Republic of Adygea bear this name:
Novy, Giaginsky District, Republic of Adygea, a settlement in Giaginsky District; 
Novy, Takhtamukaysky District, Republic of Adygea, a settlement in Takhtamukaysky District;

Altai Krai
As of 2012, two rural localities in Altai Krai bear this name:
Novy, Kalmansky District, Altai Krai, a settlement in Zimarevsky Selsoviet of Kalmansky District; 
Novy, Pervomaysky District, Altai Krai, a settlement in Berezovsky Selsoviet of Pervomaysky District;

Amur Oblast
As of 2012, one rural locality in Amur Oblast bears this name:
Novoye, Amur Oblast, a selo in Novinsky Rural Settlement of Belogorsky District

Arkhangelsk Oblast
As of 2012, four rural localities in Arkhangelsk Oblast bear this name:
Novy, Konoshsky District, Arkhangelsk Oblast, a settlement in Podyuzhsky Selsoviet of Konoshsky District
Novy, Vinogradovsky District, Arkhangelsk Oblast, a settlement under the administrative jurisdiction of Bereznik Urban-Type Settlement with Jurisdictional Territory in Vinogradovsky District
Novaya, Kholmogorsky District, Arkhangelsk Oblast, a village in Zachachyevsky Selsoviet of Kholmogorsky District
Novaya, Nyandomsky District, Arkhangelsk Oblast, a settlement in Limsky Selsoviet of Nyandomsky District

Republic of Bashkortostan
As of 2012, three rural localities in the Republic of Bashkortostan bear this name:
Novy, Iglinsky District, Republic of Bashkortostan, a village in Nadezhdinsky Selsoviet of Iglinsky District
Novy, Yermekeyevsky District, Republic of Bashkortostan, a selo in Beketovsky Selsoviet of Yermekeyevsky District
Novaya, Republic of Bashkortostan, a village in Arslanovsky Selsoviet of Chishminsky District

Belgorod Oblast
As of 2012, two rural localities in Belgorod Oblast bear this name:
Novy, Belgorod Oblast, a settlement in Shidlovsky Rural Okrug of Volokonovsky District
Novoye, Belgorod Oblast, a selo in Tishansky Rural Okrug of Volokonovsky District

Bryansk Oblast
As of 2012, one rural locality in Bryansk Oblast bears this name:
Novoye, Bryansk Oblast, a village in Stolbovsky Rural Administrative Okrug of Brasovsky District;

Chelyabinsk Oblast
As of 2012, three rural localities in Chelyabinsk Oblast bear this name:
Novy, Bredinsky District, Chelyabinsk Oblast, a settlement in Belokamensky Selsoviet of Bredinsky District
Novy, Kizilsky District, Chelyabinsk Oblast, a settlement in Karabulaksky Selsoviet of Kizilsky District
Novy, Krasnoarmeysky District, Chelyabinsk Oblast, a settlement in Lazurnensky Selsoviet of Krasnoarmeysky District

Chuvash Republic
As of 2012, two rural localities in the Chuvash Republic bear this name:
Novy, Chuvash Republic, a settlement in Malobikshikhskoye Rural Settlement of Kanashsky District
Novaya, Chuvash Republic, a village in Shumshevashskoye Rural Settlement of Alikovsky District

Republic of Dagestan
As of 2012, one rural locality in the Republic of Dagestan bears this name:
Novoye, Republic of Dagestan, a selo in Kizlyarsky Selsoviet of Kizlyarsky District;

Ivanovo Oblast
As of 2012, five rural localities in Ivanovo Oblast bear this name:
Novoye, Ivanovo Oblast, a selo in Privolzhsky District
Novaya, Gavrilovo-Posadsky District, Ivanovo Oblast, a village in Gavrilovo-Posadsky District
Novaya, Ivanovsky District, Ivanovo Oblast, a village in Ivanovsky District
Novaya, Palekhsky District, Ivanovo Oblast, a village in Palekhsky District
Novaya, Shuysky District, Ivanovo Oblast, a village in Shuysky District

Jewish Autonomous Oblast
As of 2012, two rural localities in the Jewish Autonomous Oblast bear this name:
Novy, Jewish Autonomous Oblast, a selo in Obluchensky District
Novoye, Jewish Autonomous Oblast, a selo in Leninsky District

Kaliningrad Oblast
As of 2012, two rural localities in Kaliningrad Oblast bear this name:
Novy, Kaliningrad Oblast, a settlement in Kutuzovsky Rural Okrug of Guryevsky District
Novoye, Kaliningrad Oblast, a settlement under the administrative jurisdiction of the Town of District Significance of Pravdinsk in Pravdinsky District

Republic of Kalmykia
As of 2012, three rural localities in the Republic of Kalmykia bear this name:
Novy, Chernozemelsky District, Republic of Kalmykia, a settlement in Achinerovskaya Rural Administration of Chernozemelsky District; 
Novy, Ketchenerovsky District, Republic of Kalmykia, a settlement in Altsynkhutinskaya Rural Administration of Ketchenerovsky District; 
Novy, Sarpinsky District, Republic of Kalmykia, a settlement in Sharnutovskaya Rural Administration of Sarpinsky District;

Kaluga Oblast
As of 2012, four rural localities in Kaluga Oblast bear this name:
Novy, Kaluga, Kaluga Oblast, a settlement under the administrative jurisdiction of the City of Kaluga
Novy, Duminichsky District, Kaluga Oblast, a settlement in Duminichsky District
Novaya, Kuybyshevsky District, Kaluga Oblast, a village in Kuybyshevsky District
Novaya, Medynsky District, Kaluga Oblast, a village in Medynsky District

Kamchatka Krai
As of 2012, one rural locality in Kamchatka Krai bears this name:
Novy, Kamchatka Krai, a settlement in Yelizovsky District

Karachay-Cherkess Republic
As of 2012, one rural locality in the Karachay-Cherkess Republic bears this name:
Novy, Karachay-Cherkess Republic, a settlement in Prikubansky District;

Kemerovo Oblast
As of 2012, three rural localities in Kemerovo Oblast bear this name:
Novy, Leninsk-Kuznetsky District, Kemerovo Oblast, a settlement in Chusovitinskaya Rural Territory of Leninsk-Kuznetsky District; 
Novy, Novokuznetsky District, Kemerovo Oblast, a settlement in Sosnovskaya Rural Territory of Novokuznetsky District; 
Novy, Tashtagolsky District, Kemerovo Oblast, a settlement in Ust-Kabyrzinskaya Rural Territory of Tashtagolsky District;

Kirov Oblast
As of 2012, four rural localities in Kirov Oblast bear this name:
Novy, Murashinsky District, Kirov Oblast, a settlement in Bezbozhnikovsky Rural Okrug of Murashinsky District; 
Novy, Sanchursky District, Kirov Oblast, a pochinok in Matvinursky Rural Okrug of Sanchursky District; 
Novy, Sovetsky District, Kirov Oblast, a settlement in Rodyginsky Rural Okrug of Sovetsky District; 
Novy, Sunsky District, Kirov Oblast, a settlement in Bolshevistsky Rural Okrug of Sunsky District;

Kostroma Oblast
As of 2012, seven rural localities in Kostroma Oblast bear this name:
Novy, Kostromskoy District, Kostroma Oblast, a settlement in Kuznetsovskoye Settlement of Kostromskoy District
Novy, Ponazyrevsky District, Kostroma Oblast, a settlement in Poldnevitskoye Settlement of Ponazyrevsky District
Novoye, Galichsky District, Kostroma Oblast, a village in Dmitriyevskoye Settlement of Galichsky District
Novoye, Krasnoselsky District, Kostroma Oblast, a village in Chapayevskoye Settlement of Krasnoselsky District
Novaya, Ostrovsky District, Kostroma Oblast, a village in Klevantsovskoye Settlement of Ostrovsky District
Novaya, Susaninsky District, Kostroma Oblast, a village in Sumarokovskoye Settlement of Susaninsky District
Novaya, Vokhomsky District, Kostroma Oblast, a village in Belkovskoye Settlement of Vokhomsky District

Krasnodar Krai
As of 2012, nine rural localities in Krasnodar Krai bear this name:
Novy, Belorechensk, Krasnodar Krai, a settlement in Yuzhny Rural Okrug under the administrative jurisdiction of the Town of Belorechensk
Novy, Krasnodar, Krasnodar Krai, a khutor in Berezovsky Rural Okrug under the administrative jurisdiction of Prikubansky Okrug under the administrative jurisdiction of the City of Krasnodar
Novy, Abinsky District, Krasnodar Krai, a settlement in Kholmsky Rural Okrug of Abinsky District
Novy, Dinskoy District, Krasnodar Krai, a khutor in Staromyshastovsky Rural Okrug of Dinskoy District
Novy, Krymsky District, Krasnodar Krai, a khutor in Kiyevsky Rural Okrug of Krymsky District
Novy, Pavlovsky District, Krasnodar Krai, a khutor in Pavlovsky Stanitsa Okrug of Pavlovsky District
Novy, Seversky District, Krasnodar Krai, a khutor in Novodmitriyevsky Rural Okrug of Seversky District
Novy, Novoleninsky Rural Okrug, Timashyovsky District, Krasnodar Krai, a khutor in Novoleninsky Rural Okrug of Timashyovsky District
Novy, Poselkovy Rural Okrug, Timashyovsky District, Krasnodar Krai, a settlement in Poselkovy Rural Okrug of Timashyovsky District

Krasnoyarsk Krai
As of 2012, three rural localities in Krasnoyarsk Krai bear this name:
Novy, Krasnoyarsk Krai, a settlement in Mikhaylovsky Selsoviet of Dzerzhinsky District
Novaya, Rybinsky District, Krasnoyarsk Krai, a village in Novinsky Selsoviet of Rybinsky District
Novaya, Taymyrsky Dolgano-Nenetsky District, Krasnoyarsk Krai, a settlement in Khatanga Inhabited Locality of Taymyrsky Dolgano-Nenetsky District

Leningrad Oblast
As of 2012, ten rural localities in Leningrad Oblast bear this name:
Novy, Slantsevsky District, Leningrad Oblast, a logging depot settlement in Staropolskoye Settlement Municipal Formation of Slantsevsky District
Novy, Tikhvinsky District, Leningrad Oblast, a logging depot settlement in Gorskoye Settlement Municipal Formation of Tikhvinsky District
Novoye, Leningrad Oblast, a village under the administrative jurisdiction of Boksitogorskoye Settlement Municipal Formation in Boksitogorsky District
Novaya, Yelizavetinskoye Settlement Municipal Formation, Gatchinsky District, Leningrad Oblast, a village in Yelizavetinskoye Settlement Municipal Formation of Gatchinsky District
Novaya, Taitskoye Settlement Municipal Formation, Gatchinsky District, Leningrad Oblast, a village under the administrative jurisdiction of Taitskoye Settlement Municipal Formation in Gatchinsky District
Novaya, Kirishsky District, Leningrad Oblast, a village under the administrative jurisdiction of Budogoshchskoye Settlement Municipal Formation in Kirishsky District
Novaya, Tikhvinsky District, Leningrad Oblast, a village in Tsvylevskoye Settlement Municipal Formation of Tikhvinsky District
Novaya, Tosnensky District, Leningrad Oblast, a village under the administrative jurisdiction of Fornosovskoye Settlement Municipal Formation in Tosnensky District
Novaya, Kiselninskoye Settlement Municipal Formation, Volkhovsky District, Leningrad Oblast, a village in Kiselninskoye Settlement Municipal Formation of Volkhovsky District
Novaya, Pashskoye Settlement Municipal Formation, Volkhovsky District, Leningrad Oblast, a village in Pashskoye Settlement Municipal Formation of Volkhovsky District

Lipetsk Oblast
As of 2012, five rural localities in Lipetsk Oblast bear this name:
Novy, Lipetsk Oblast, a settlement in Volovchinsky Selsoviet of Volovsky District
Novaya, Dankovsky District, Lipetsk Oblast, a village in Berezovsky Selsoviet of Dankovsky District
Novaya, Dobrinsky District, Lipetsk Oblast, a village in Verkhnematrensky Selsoviet of Dobrinsky District
Novaya, Izmalkovsky District, Lipetsk Oblast, a village in Lebyazhensky Selsoviet of Izmalkovsky District
Novaya, Krasninsky District, Lipetsk Oblast, a village in Ishcheinsky Selsoviet of Krasninsky District

Mari El Republic
As of 2012, five rural localities in the Mari El Republic bear this name:
Novy, Gornomariysky District, Mari El Republic, a settlement in Vilovatovsky Rural Okrug of Gornomariysky District
Novy, Medvedevsky District, Mari El Republic, a settlement in Pekshiksolinsky Rural Okrug of Medvedevsky District
Novaya, Troitskoposadsky Rural Okrug, Gornomariysky District, Mari El Republic, a village in Troitskoposadsky Rural Okrug of Gornomariysky District
Novaya, Yelasovsky Rural Okrug, Gornomariysky District, Mari El Republic, a village in Yelasovsky Rural Okrug of Gornomariysky District
Novaya, Morkinsky District, Mari El Republic, a village under the administrative jurisdiction of Morki Urban-Type Settlement in Morkinsky District

Moscow Oblast
As of 2012, eighteen rural localities in Moscow Oblast bear this name:
Novy, Krasnogorsky District, Moscow Oblast, a settlement in Ilyinskoye Rural Settlement of Krasnogorsky District
Novy, Yegoryevsky District, Moscow Oblast, a settlement under the administrative jurisdiction of the Town of Yegoryevsk in Yegoryevsky District
Novoye, Kolomensky District, Moscow Oblast, a village in Nepetsinskoye Rural Settlement of Kolomensky District
Novoye, Orekhovo-Zuyevsky District, Moscow Oblast, a village in Novinskoye Rural Settlement of Orekhovo-Zuyevsky District
Novoye, Ramensky District, Moscow Oblast, a selo in Zabolotyevskoye Rural Settlement of Ramensky District
Novoye, Shakhovskoy District, Moscow Oblast, a village in Seredinskoye Rural Settlement of Shakhovskoy District
Novoye, Solnechnogorsky District, Moscow Oblast, a village in Smirnovskoye Rural Settlement of Solnechnogorsky District
Novoye, Volokolamsky District, Moscow Oblast, a village in Teryayevskoye Rural Settlement of Volokolamsky District
Novaya, Klinsky District, Moscow Oblast, a village in Voroninskoye Rural Settlement of Klinsky District
Novaya, Kolomensky District, Moscow Oblast, a village in Khoroshovskoye Rural Settlement of Kolomensky District
Novaya, Mozhaysky District, Moscow Oblast, a village under the administrative jurisdiction of the Town of Mozhaysk in Mozhaysky District
Novaya, Naro-Fominsky District, Moscow Oblast, a village in Tashirovskoye Rural Settlement of Naro-Fominsky District
Novaya, Orekhovo-Zuyevsky District, Moscow Oblast, a village in Gorskoye Rural Settlement of Orekhovo-Zuyevsky District
Novaya, Staroruzskoye Rural Settlement, Ruzsky District, Moscow Oblast, a village in Staroruzskoye Rural Settlement of Ruzsky District
Novaya, Volkovskoye Rural Settlement, Ruzsky District, Moscow Oblast, a village in Volkovskoye Rural Settlement of Ruzsky District
Novaya, Serpukhovsky District, Moscow Oblast, a village in Vasilyevskoye Rural Settlement of Serpukhovsky District
Novaya, Solnechnogorsky District, Moscow Oblast, a village in Sokolovskoye Rural Settlement of Solnechnogorsky District
Novaya, Taldomsky District, Moscow Oblast, a village in Guslevskoye Rural Settlement of Taldomsky District

Nizhny Novgorod Oblast
As of 2012, six rural localities in Nizhny Novgorod Oblast bear this name:
Novoye, Dalnekonstantinovsky District, Nizhny Novgorod Oblast, a selo in Dubravsky Selsoviet of Dalnekonstantinovsky District
Novoye, Shatkovsky District, Nizhny Novgorod Oblast, a selo in Silinsky Selsoviet of Shatkovsky District
Novaya, Nizhny Novgorod, Nizhny Novgorod Oblast, a village under the administrative jurisdiction of Nizhegorodsky City District of the city of oblast significance of Nizhny Novgorod
Novaya, Chkalovsky District, Nizhny Novgorod Oblast, a village in Purekhovsky Selsoviet of Chkalovsky District
Novaya, Knyagininsky District, Nizhny Novgorod Oblast, a village in Solovyevsky Selsoviet of Knyagininsky District
Novaya, Spassky District, Nizhny Novgorod Oblast, a village in Vysokooselsky Selsoviet of Spassky District

Republic of North Ossetia–Alania
As of 2012, one rural locality in the Republic of North Ossetia–Alania bears this name:
Novoye, Republic of North Ossetia–Alania, a selo in Chermensky Rural Okrug of Prigorodny District

Novgorod Oblast
As of 2012, six rural localities in Novgorod Oblast bear this name:
Novaya, Chudovsky District, Novgorod Oblast, a village in Gruzinskoye Settlement of Chudovsky District
Novaya, Kholmsky District, Novgorod Oblast, a village in Krasnoborskoye Settlement of Kholmsky District
Novaya, Malovishersky District, Novgorod Oblast, a village in Verebyinskoye Settlement of Malovishersky District
Novaya, Moshenskoy District, Novgorod Oblast, a village in Orekhovskoye Settlement of Moshenskoy District
Novaya, Soletsky District, Novgorod Oblast, a village in Vybitskoye Settlement of Soletsky District
Novaya, Valdaysky District, Novgorod Oblast, a village in Roshchinskoye Settlement of Valdaysky District

Omsk Oblast
As of 2012, one rural locality in Omsk Oblast bears this name:
Novaya, Omsk Oblast, a village in Kalininsky Rural Okrug of Omsky District

Orenburg Oblast
As of 2012, two rural localities in Orenburg Oblast bear this name:
Novy, Kuvandyksky District, Orenburg Oblast, a settlement in Uralsky Selsoviet of Kuvandyksky District
Novy, Sorochinsky District, Orenburg Oblast, a settlement in Roshchinsky Selsoviet of Sorochinsky District

Oryol Oblast
As of 2012, three rural localities in Oryol Oblast bear this name:
Novaya, Konshinsky Selsoviet, Verkhovsky District, Oryol Oblast, a village in Konshinsky Selsoviet of Verkhovsky District
Novaya, Pesochensky Selsoviet, Verkhovsky District, Oryol Oblast, a village in Pesochensky Selsoviet of Verkhovsky District
Novaya, Russko-Brodsky Selsoviet, Verkhovsky District, Oryol Oblast, a village in Russko-Brodsky Selsoviet of Verkhovsky District

Penza Oblast
As of 2012, one rural locality in Penza Oblast bears this name:
Novoye, Penza Oblast, a selo in Kirovsky Selsoviet of Serdobsky District

Perm Krai
As of 2012, two rural localities in Perm Krai bear this name:
Novy, Karagaysky District, Perm Krai, a settlement in Karagaysky District
Novy, Permsky District, Perm Krai, a settlement in Permsky District

Primorsky Krai
As of 2012, two rural localities in Primorsky Krai bear this name:
Novy, Primorsky Krai, a settlement in Nadezhdinsky District
Novoye, Primorsky Krai, a selo in Mikhaylovsky District

Pskov Oblast
As of 2012, nine rural localities in Pskov Oblast bear this name:
Novoye, Bezhanitsky District, Pskov Oblast, a village in Bezhanitsky District
Novoye, Novosokolnichesky District, Pskov Oblast, a village in Novosokolnichesky District
Novaya, Loknyansky District, Pskov Oblast, a village in Loknyansky District
Novaya, Ostrovsky District, Pskov Oblast, a village in Ostrovsky District
Novaya (Izborskaya Rural Settlement), Pechorsky District, Pskov Oblast, a village in Pechorsky District; municipally, a part of Izborskaya Rural Settlement of that district
Novaya (Panikovskaya Rural Settlement), Pechorsky District, Pskov Oblast, a village in Pechorsky District; municipally, a part of Panikovskaya Rural Settlement of that district
Novaya, Pskovsky District, Pskov Oblast, a village in Pskovsky District
Novaya, Pustoshkinsky District, Pskov Oblast, a village in Pustoshkinsky District
Novaya, Usvyatsky District, Pskov Oblast, a village in Usvyatsky District

Rostov Oblast
As of 2012, three rural localities in Rostov Oblast bear this name:
Novy, Azovsky District, Rostov Oblast, a settlement in Kalinovskoye Rural Settlement of Azovsky District
Novy, Martynovsky District, Rostov Oblast, a khutor in Rubashkinskoye Rural Settlement of Martynovsky District
Novy, Vesyolovsky District, Rostov Oblast, a settlement in Verkhnesolenovskoye Rural Settlement of Vesyolovsky District

Ryazan Oblast
As of 2012, six rural localities in Ryazan Oblast bear this name:
Novy, Ryazan Oblast, a settlement in Protasyevo-Uglyansky Rural Okrug of Chuchkovsky District
Novoye, Sasovsky District, Ryazan Oblast, a village in Saltykovsky Rural Okrug of Sasovsky District
Novoye, Skopinsky District, Ryazan Oblast, a selo in Novinsky Rural Okrug of Skopinsky District
Novaya, Miloslavsky District, Ryazan Oblast, a village in Bolshepodovechinsky Rural Okrug of Miloslavsky District
Novaya, Shatsky District, Ryazan Oblast, a village in Shevyrlyayevsky Rural Okrug of Shatsky District
Novaya, Ukholovsky District, Ryazan Oblast, a village in Bogoroditsky Rural Okrug of Ukholovsky District

Sakha Republic
As of 2012, two rural localities in the Sakha Republic bear this name:
Novy, Mirninsky District, Sakha Republic, a selo under the administrative jurisdiction of the settlement of Almazny in Mirninsky District
Novy, Tomponsky District, Sakha Republic, a selo in Ynginsky Rural Okrug of Tomponsky District

Sakhalin Oblast
As of 2012, two rural localities in Sakhalin Oblast bear this name:
Novoye, Korsakovsky District, Sakhalin Oblast, a selo in Korsakovsky District
Novoye, Makarovsky District, Sakhalin Oblast, a selo in Makarovsky District

Saratov Oblast
As of 2012, three rural localities in Saratov Oblast bear this name:
Novy, Perelyubsky District, Saratov Oblast, a settlement in Perelyubsky District
Novy, Rovensky District, Saratov Oblast, a settlement in Rovensky District
Novy, Yershovsky District, Saratov Oblast, a settlement in Yershovsky District

Smolensk Oblast
As of 2012, eight rural localities in Smolensk Oblast bear this name:
Novy, Smolensk Oblast, a selo in Stepanikovskoye Rural Settlement of Vyazemsky District
Novoye, Gagarinsky District, Smolensk Oblast, a village in Tokarevskoye Rural Settlement of Gagarinsky District
Novoye, Ugransky District, Smolensk Oblast, a village in Podsosonskoye Rural Settlement of Ugransky District
Novaya, Dukhovshchinsky District, Smolensk Oblast, a village in Dobrinskoye Rural Settlement of Dukhovshchinsky District
Novaya, Glinkovskoye Rural Settlement, Glinkovsky District, Smolensk Oblast, a village in Glinkovskoye Rural Settlement of Glinkovsky District
Novaya, Romodanovskoye Rural Settlement, Glinkovsky District, Smolensk Oblast, a village in Romodanovskoye Rural Settlement of Glinkovsky District
Novaya, Kholm-Zhirkovsky District, Smolensk Oblast, a village in Steshinskoye Rural Settlement of Kholm-Zhirkovsky District
Novaya, Novoduginsky District, Smolensk Oblast, a village in Izvekovskoye Rural Settlement of Novoduginsky District

Stavropol Krai
As of 2012, one rural locality in Stavropol Krai bears this name:
Novy, Stavropol Krai, a settlement in Georgiyevsky District

Sverdlovsk Oblast
As of 2012, four rural localities in Sverdlovsk Oblast bear this name:
Novy, Sverdlovsk Oblast, a settlement in Kamyshlovsky District
Novaya, Prigorodny District, Sverdlovsk Oblast, a village in Prigorodny District
Novaya, Slobodo-Turinsky District, Sverdlovsk Oblast, a village in Slobodo-Turinsky District
Novaya, Talitsky District, Sverdlovsk Oblast, a village in Talitsky District

Tambov Oblast
As of 2012, three rural localities in Tambov Oblast bear this name:
Novy, Tambov Oblast, a settlement in Dmitriyevsky Selsoviet of Morshansky District
Novaya, Sosnovsky District, Tambov Oblast, a village in Degtyansky Selsoviet of Sosnovsky District
Novaya, Uvarovsky District, Tambov Oblast, a village in Verkhneshibryaysky Selsoviet of Uvarovsky District

Republic of Tatarstan
As of 2012, two rural localities in the Republic of Tatarstan bear this name:
Novy, Mamadyshsky District, Republic of Tatarstan, a settlement in Mamadyshsky District
Novy, Tukayevsky District, Republic of Tatarstan, a settlement in Tukayevsky District

Tomsk Oblast
As of 2012, one rural locality in Tomsk Oblast bears this name:
Novy, Tomsk Oblast, a settlement in Pervomaysky District

Tula Oblast
As of 2012, three rural localities in Tula Oblast bear this name:
Novy, Leninsky District, Tula Oblast, a settlement in Rassvetovsky Rural Okrug of Leninsky District
Novy, Uzlovsky District, Tula Oblast, a settlement in Lyutoricheskaya Rural Administration of Uzlovsky District
Novaya, Tula Oblast, a village in Novopokrovskaya Rural Administration of Chernsky District

Tver Oblast
As of 2012, twenty-two rural localities in Tver Oblast bear this name:
Novy, Toropetsky District, Tver Oblast, a settlement in Ploskoshskoye Rural Settlement of Toropetsky District
Novy, Vyshnevolotsky District, Tver Oblast, a settlement in Yesenovichskoye Rural Settlement of Vyshnevolotsky District
Novoye, Kalininsky District, Tver Oblast, a village in Verkhnevolzhskoye Rural Settlement of Kalininsky District
Novoye, Kalyazinsky District, Tver Oblast, a village in Nerlskoye Rural Settlement of Kalyazinsky District
Novoye, Kiverichi Rural Settlement, Rameshkovsky District, Tver Oblast, a village in Kiverichi Rural Settlement of Rameshkovsky District
Novoye, Vysokovo Rural Settlement, Rameshkovsky District, Tver Oblast, a village in Vysokovo Rural Settlement of Rameshkovsky District
Novoye, Pankovo Rural Settlement, Staritsky District, Tver Oblast, a village in Pankovo Rural Settlement of Staritsky District
Novoye, Staritsa Rural Settlement, Staritsky District, Tver Oblast, a village in Staritsa Rural Settlement of Staritsky District
Novoye, Ploskoshskoye Rural Settlement, Toropetsky District, Tver Oblast, a village in Ploskoshskoye Rural Settlement of Toropetsky District
Novoye, Ploskoshskoye Rural Settlement, Toropetsky District, Tver Oblast, a village in Ploskoshskoye Rural Settlement of Toropetsky District
Novoye, Torzhoksky District, Tver Oblast, a village in Vysokovskoye Rural Settlement of Torzhoksky District
Novoye, Vesyegonsky District, Tver Oblast, a village in Romanovskoye Rural Settlement of Vesyegonsky District
Novoye, Pogorelskoye Rural Settlement, Zubtsovsky District, Tver Oblast, a village in Pogorelskoye Rural Settlement of Zubtsovsky District
Novoye, Stolipinskoye Rural Settlement, Zubtsovsky District, Tver Oblast, a village in Stolipinskoye Rural Settlement of Zubtsovsky District
Novaya, Andreapolsky District, Tver Oblast, a village in Khotilitskoye Rural Settlement of Andreapolsky District
Novaya, Likhoslavlsky District, Tver Oblast, a village in Kavskoye Rural Settlement of Likhoslavlsky District
Novaya, Grishinskoye Rural Settlement, Oleninsky District, Tver Oblast, a village in Grishinskoye Rural Settlement of Oleninsky District
Novaya, Mostovskoye Rural Settlement, Oleninsky District, Tver Oblast, a village in Mostovskoye Rural Settlement of Oleninsky District
Novaya, Mostovskoye Rural Settlement, Oleninsky District, Tver Oblast, a village in Mostovskoye Rural Settlement of Oleninsky District
Novaya, Toropetsky District, Tver Oblast, a village in Skvortsovskoye Rural Settlement of Toropetsky District
Novaya, Zapadnodvinsky District, Tver Oblast, a village in Zapadnodvinskoye Rural Settlement of Zapadnodvinsky District
Novaya, Zharkovsky District, Tver Oblast, a village in Shchucheyskoye Rural Settlement of Zharkovsky District

Udmurt Republic
As of 2012, one rural locality in the Udmurt Republic bears this name:
Novy, Udmurt Republic, a settlement in Votkinsky District

Ulyanovsk Oblast
As of 2012, one rural locality in Ulyanovsk Oblast bears this name:
Novy, Ulyanovsk Oblast, a settlement under the administrative jurisdiction of Nikolayevsky Settlement Okrug in Nikolayevsky District

Vladimir Oblast
As of 2012, ten rural localities in Vladimir Oblast bear this name:
Novy, Kovrovsky District, Vladimir Oblast, a settlement in Kovrovsky District
Novy, Suzdalsky District, Vladimir Oblast, a settlement in Suzdalsky District
Novoye, Kolchuginsky District, Vladimir Oblast, a selo in Kolchuginsky District
Novoye, Kovrovsky District, Vladimir Oblast, a selo in Kovrovsky District
Novoye, Suzdalsky District, Vladimir Oblast, a selo in Suzdalsky District
Novoye, Yuryev-Polsky District, Vladimir Oblast, a selo in Yuryev-Polsky District
Novaya, Kolchuginsky District, Vladimir Oblast, a village in Kolchuginsky District
Novaya, Kolchuginsky District, Vladimir Oblast, a village in Kolchuginsky District
Novaya, Sudogodsky District, Vladimir Oblast, a village in Sudogodsky District
Novaya, Yuryev-Polsky District, Vladimir Oblast, a village in Yuryev-Polsky District

Volgograd Oblast
As of 2012, one rural locality in Volgograd Oblast bears this name:
Novy, Volgograd Oblast, a khutor in Kaysatsky Selsoviet of Pallasovsky District

Vologda Oblast
As of 2012, twenty-one rural localities in Vologda Oblast bear this name:
Novy, Kichmengsko-Gorodetsky District, Vologda Oblast, a pochinok in Verkhneyentalsky Selsoviet of Kichmengsko-Gorodetsky District
Novy, Sokolsky District, Vologda Oblast, a settlement in Dvinitsky Selsoviet of Sokolsky District
Novoye, Gryazovetsky District, Vologda Oblast, a village in Yurovsky Selsoviet of Gryazovetsky District
Novoye, Kaduysky District, Vologda Oblast, a village in Nikolsky Selsoviet of Kaduysky District
Novoye, Mezhdurechensky District, Vologda Oblast, a selo in Staroselsky Selsoviet of Mezhdurechensky District
Novoye, Chuchkovsky Selsoviet, Sokolsky District, Vologda Oblast, a village in Chuchkovsky Selsoviet of Sokolsky District
Novoye, Nesterovsky Selsoviet, Sokolsky District, Vologda Oblast, a village in Nesterovsky Selsoviet of Sokolsky District
Novoye, Vorobyevsky Selsoviet, Sokolsky District, Vologda Oblast, a village in Vorobyevsky Selsoviet of Sokolsky District
Novoye, Filisovsky Selsoviet, Ust-Kubinsky District, Vologda Oblast, a selo in Filisovsky Selsoviet of Ust-Kubinsky District
Novoye, Mitensky Selsoviet, Ust-Kubinsky District, Vologda Oblast, a village in Mitensky Selsoviet of Ust-Kubinsky District
Novoye, Borisovsky Selsoviet, Vologodsky District, Vologda Oblast, a village in Borisovsky Selsoviet of Vologodsky District
Novoye, Leskovsky Selsoviet, Vologodsky District, Vologda Oblast, a village in Leskovsky Selsoviet of Vologodsky District
Novoye, Pudegsky Selsoviet, Vologodsky District, Vologda Oblast, a village in Pudegsky Selsoviet of Vologodsky District
Novoye, Sosnovsky Selsoviet, Vologodsky District, Vologda Oblast, a village in Sosnovsky Selsoviet of Vologodsky District
Novaya, Babayevsky District, Vologda Oblast, a village in Novostarinsky Selsoviet of Babayevsky District
Novaya, Chagodoshchensky District, Vologda Oblast, a village in Pervomaysky Selsoviet of Chagodoshchensky District
Novaya, Cherepovetsky District, Vologda Oblast, a village in Musorsky Selsoviet of Cherepovetsky District
Novaya, Mezhdurechensky District, Vologda Oblast, a village in Nozemsky Selsoviet of Mezhdurechensky District
Novaya, Ustyuzhensky District, Vologda Oblast, a village in Mezzhensky Selsoviet of Ustyuzhensky District
Novaya, Vozhegodsky District, Vologda Oblast, a village in Yavengsky Selsoviet of Vozhegodsky District
Novaya, Vytegorsky District, Vologda Oblast, a village in Kemsky Selsoviet of Vytegorsky District

Yaroslavl Oblast
As of 2012, nineteen rural localities in Yaroslavl Oblast bear this name:
Novy, Breytovsky District, Yaroslavl Oblast, a settlement in Ulyanovsky Rural Okrug of Breytovsky District
Novy, Gavrilov-Yamsky District, Yaroslavl Oblast, a settlement in Velikoselsky Rural Okrug of Gavrilov-Yamsky District
Novoye, Bolsheselsky District, Yaroslavl Oblast, a selo in Novoselsky Rural Okrug of Bolsheselsky District
Novoye, Breytovsky District, Yaroslavl Oblast, a village in Sevastyantsevsky Rural Okrug of Breytovsky District
Novoye, Danilovsky District, Yaroslavl Oblast, a selo in Trofimovsky Rural Okrug of Danilovsky District
Novoye, Nekrasovsky District, Yaroslavl Oblast, a selo in Burmakinsky Rural Okrug of Nekrasovsky District
Novoye, Pereslavsky District, Yaroslavl Oblast, a selo in Glebovsky Rural Okrug of Pereslavsky District
Novoye, Pervomaysky District, Yaroslavl Oblast, a selo in Ignattsevsky Rural Okrug of Pervomaysky District
Novoye, Rybinsky District, Yaroslavl Oblast, a village in Oktyabrsky Rural Okrug of Rybinsky District
Novoye, Fominsky Rural Okrug, Tutayevsky District, Yaroslavl Oblast, a village in Fominsky Rural Okrug of Tutayevsky District
Novoye, Rodionovsky Rural Okrug, Tutayevsky District, Yaroslavl Oblast, a selo in Rodionovsky Rural Okrug of Tutayevsky District
Novoye, Uglichsky District, Yaroslavl Oblast, a village in Vozdvizhensky Rural Okrug of Uglichsky District
Novaya, Bolsheselsky District, Yaroslavl Oblast, a village in Bolsheselsky Rural Okrug of Bolsheselsky District
Novaya, Nekrasovsky District, Yaroslavl Oblast, a village in Diyevo-Gorodishchensky Rural Okrug of Nekrasovsky District
Novaya, Pereslavsky District, Yaroslavl Oblast, a village in Veskovsky Rural Okrug of Pereslavsky District
Novaya, Oktyabrsky Rural Okrug, Rybinsky District, Yaroslavl Oblast, a village in Oktyabrsky Rural Okrug of Rybinsky District
Novaya, Pokrovsky Rural Okrug, Rybinsky District, Yaroslavl Oblast, a village in Pokrovsky Rural Okrug of Rybinsky District
Novaya, Uglichsky District, Yaroslavl Oblast, a village in Maymersky Rural Okrug of Uglichsky District
Novaya, Yaroslavsky District, Yaroslavl Oblast, a village in Nekrasovsky Rural Okrug of Yaroslavsky District

Zabaykalsky Krai
As of 2012, one rural locality in Zabaykalsky Krai bears this name:
Novoye, Zabaykalsky Krai, a selo in Shilkinsky District

Abolished localities
Novaya, Krasnobakovsky District, Nizhny Novgorod Oblast, a village in Prudovsky Selsoviet of Krasnobakovsky District in Nizhny Novgorod Oblast; abolished in July 2009

Alternative names
Novaya, alternative name of Novaya Taraba, a selo in Novotarabinsky Selsoviet of Kytmanovsky District in Altai Krai; 
Novy, alternative name of Novoye, a selo in Kizlyarsky Selsoviet of Kizlyarsky District in the Republic of Dagestan; 
Novoye, alternative name of Novoye Selo, a selo in Melensky Rural Administrative Okrug of Starodubsky District in Bryansk Oblast;